Robert Barbour (29 March 1899 – 29 December 1994) was an Australian cricketer. He played six first-class matches for Oxford University Cricket Club and Queensland between 1919 and 1923. He won a Rhodes Scholarship to study at Balliol College, Oxford. He returned to Australia and was warden of Melbourne University Union 1940–54 and senior lecturer in classics 1954–67.

See also
 List of Oxford University Cricket Club players
 List of Queensland first-class cricketers

References

External links
 

1899 births
1994 deaths
Australian cricketers
Oxford University cricketers
Queensland cricketers
Cricketers from Sydney
Australian Rhodes Scholars
Alumni of Balliol College, Oxford
Academic staff of the University of Melbourne
Australian male tennis players